
In mathematics, a group is called an Iwasawa group, M-group or modular group if its lattice of subgroups is modular. Alternatively, a group G is called an Iwasawa group when every subgroup of G is permutable in G .

 proved that a p-group G is an Iwasawa group if and only if one of the following cases happens:
 G is a Dedekind group, or
 G contains an abelian normal subgroup N such that the quotient group G/N is a cyclic group and if q denotes a generator of G/N, then for all n ∈ N, q−1nq = n1+ps where s ≥ 1 in general, but s ≥ 2 for p=2.

In , Iwasawa's proof was deemed to have essential gaps, which were filled by Franco Napolitani and Zvonimir Janko.  has provided an alternative proof along different lines in his textbook.

Every subgroup of a finite p-group is subnormal, and those finite groups in which subnormality and permutability coincide are called PT-groups.  In other words, a finite p-group is an Iwasawa group if and only if it is a PT-group.

Examples
The Iwasawa group of order 16 is isomorphic to the modular maximal-cyclic group of order 16.

See also
 Modular law for groups

Further reading
Modern study includes .

References

Finite groups
Properties of groups